Tialla is a village in the Fara Department of Balé Province in southern Burkina Faso. The village has a total population of 667.

References

Populated places in the Boucle du Mouhoun Region